Marginella gennesi is a species of sea snail, a marine gastropod mollusk in the family Marginellidae, the margin snails.

Description
The length of the shell attains 1.5 mm.

Distribution
This species occurs in the Red Sea off Djibouti.

References

 Dautzenberg P. (1929). Contribution à l'étude de la faune de Madagascar: Mollusca marina testacea. Faune des colonies françaises, 3(4): 321–636, pls 4–7. Société d'Editions géographiques, maritimes et coloniales, Paris.
 Fischer, H., 1901. Liste des coquilles recueillies par M. de Gennes à Djibouti et Ali-Sabieh, avec la description de plusieurs formes nouvelles. Journal de Conchyliologie 49: 96–130, 1pl

gennesi
Gastropods described in 1901